Laurana may refer to: 

Francesco Laurana (c. 1430 – c. 1502), Dalmatian-born sculptor and medalist
Luciano Laurana (c. 1420–1479), Italian architect and engineer 
Laurana Kanan, a fictional character from the Dragonlance fantasy series

See also
Lovran, Croatia (Italian: Laurana)